"Wordplay" is a song by Jason Mraz released as the first single from his 2005 album Mr. A–Z. The song was Mraz's second entry on the Billboard Hot 100 at number 81 after "The Remedy (I Won't Worry)".

The song was the most successful single from Mr. A–Z.

Music video
Directed by Dean Karr, the video starts with Mraz, his band, and a wizard (who magically plays the guitar) all playing their instruments in a field. He is then seen sitting on fallen tree playing his guitar. While he is playing his guitar an old man can be seen walking by who cannot stand listening to the music he is playing. The old man then begins the process of stoning him to try to get him to stop. Throughout the video more and more people gather to continue stoning him. The wizard, who is playing the guitar, is actually Mraz himself dressed as the wizard. The video then continues to show all of the previous shots. It ends with him extremely injured from being stoned and then fades to black.

Track listing
 "I'm Yours" (original demo)
 "Wordplay"
 "Life Is Wonderful" (alternate version) (featuring Gregory Page)

Personnel
Jason Mraz – lead vocals, acoustic and electric guitars
Jack Daley – bass guitar
Lyle Workman – electric guitar, Dobro resonator guitar
Nir "Nir Z" Zidkyahu – drums
Roger Joseph Manning, Jr. – keyboards
Bashiri Johnson – percussion
Josh Deutsch – castanets, production, executive production
Kevin Kadish – acoustic guitar, production
Samuel "Vaughn" Merrick – engineering
David Thoener – mixing
Ted Jensen – mastering

Charts

References

2005 singles
Jason Mraz songs
Song recordings produced by Steve Lillywhite
Songs written by Jason Mraz
2005 songs
Atlantic Records singles
Songs written by Kevin Kadish